General Fuller may refer to:

Algernon Fuller (1885–1970), British Army major general
Ben Hebard Fuller (1870–1937), U.S. Marine Corps major general
Cuthbert Fuller (1874–1960), British Army major general
Francis Fuller (British Army officer) (died 1748), British Army major general
Horace H. Fuller (1886–1966), U.S. Army major general
J. F. C. Fuller (1878–1966), British Army major general
James A. Fuller (1823–1902), British Army general
John Augustus Fuller (1828–1902), British Army general
John W. Fuller (1827–1891), Union Army brevet major general
Lawrence J. Fuller (1914–1998), U.S. Army major general